The 2021 Hankook 12 Hours of Hockenheimring was the inaugural running of the 12 Hours of Hockenheimring which took place on 22 and 23 May 2021. It was also the fourth round of the 2021 24H GT and TCE Series and the second 24H Series event at the circuit, having held a 16-hour race in 2020.

Schedule

Entry list
30 cars are entered into the event; 22 GT cars and 8 TCEs.

Results

Qualifying

TCE
Fastest in class in bold.

GT
Fastest in class in bold.

Race

Part 1
Class winner in bold.

Part 2
Class winner in bold.

Footnotes

References

External links

12 Hours of Hockenheimring
12 Hours of Hockenheimring
2021 in 24H Series